Brodheadsville is a census-designated place (CDP) in Monroe County, Pennsylvania, United States. The population was 1,700 at the 2020 census. The community is served by Pleasant Valley School District.

Geography
Brodheadsville is located at  (40.926724, -75.404707).

Pennsylvania Route 115 and 715's southern termini are on U.S. Route 209 in Brodheadsville. Route 115 provides access from Wilkes-Barre and 715 provides access from Henryville, while U.S. 209 provides access from Lehighton and Stroudsburg.

Demographics

As of the census of 2000, there were 1,637 people, 602 households, and 461 families residing in the CDP. The population density was 382.8 people per square mile (147.7/km2). There were 667 housing units at an average density of 156.0/sq mi (60.2/km2). The racial makeup of the CDP was 93.77% White, 2.50% African American, 0.12% Native American, 1.47% Asian, 0.43% from other races, and 1.71% from two or more races. Hispanic or Latino of any race were 2.87% of the population.

There were 602 households, out of which 35.4% had children under the age of 18 living with them, 64.8% were married couples living together, 9.5% had a female householder with no husband present, and 23.3% were non-families. 18.9% of all households were made up of individuals, and 7.0% had someone living alone who was 65 years of age or older. The average household size was 2.71 and the average family size was 3.10.

In the CDP, the population was spread out, with 26.0% under the age of 18, 8.2% from 18 to 24, 27.3% from 25 to 44, 25.7% from 45 to 64, and 12.8% who were 65 years of age or older. The median age was 38 years. For every 100 females, there were 101.6 males. For every 100 females age 18 and over, there were 93.5 males.

The median income for a household in the CDP was $46,389, and the median income for a family was $52,333. Males had a median income of $47,986 versus $21,250 for females. The per capita income for the CDP was $24,140. About 3.3% of families and 9.2% of the population were below the poverty line, including 6.4% of those under age 18 and none of those age 65 or over.

References

Census-designated places in Monroe County, Pennsylvania
Census-designated places in Pennsylvania